Kiloyear may refer to:
Millennium, a period of time equal to 1000 years
Kiloannus, abbreviated ka, a period of 1000 Julian years, equal to 365,250 days